The Rise & Fall is the fourth studio album by English ska band Madness, released on 5 November 1982 by Stiff Records. This album saw Madness at their most experimental, exhibiting a range of musical styles including jazz, English music hall, and Eastern influences. NME described it at the time of its release as "the best Madness record". It has often been retrospectively described as a concept album.

Though the album was never released in the US, several tracks were later placed on the compilation Madness (1983), including "Our House", the band's only top 10 hit in America.

Content
Initially conceived as a concept album about nostalgia for childhood, the concept was eventually dropped, though the original theme is still evident particularly in the title track and the album's major hit "Our House". This theme was also mentioned recently when interviewed as part of T in the Park highlights, where their lead vocalist Suggs claimed that all the band members were told to write about their childhood memories for The Rise & Fall (although he did say that their keyboardist Mike Barson got the wrong idea, and went off and wrote about New Delhi).

Although the band had previously been avowedly apolitical, the track "Blue Skinned Beast" was an overt satire on then-UK Prime Minister Margaret Thatcher and her handling of the Falklands War, paving the way for more political comment on subsequent Madness albums.

The album cover photo was shot just west of Camden Town at the Primrose Hill viewpoint, looking southeast towards central London with the BT Tower on the horizon.

Critical reception

In a retrospective review for AllMusic, critic Stephen Thomas Erlewine gave the album four and a half out of five stars and wrote that "The Rise & Fall is recognizably Madness in sound and sensibility; faint echoes of their breakneck nutty beginnings can be heard on "Blue Skinned Beast" and "Mr. Speaker Gets the Word," the melodies are outgrowths of such early masterpieces as "My Girl," there’s a charming, open-hearted humo[u]r and carnival[-]esque swirl that ties everything together." also noting that "The rest of the record contains the same wit, effervescence, and joy, capturing what British pop life was all about in 1982, just as the Kinks Village Green Preservation Society did in 1968 or Blur's Parklife would do in 1994."

The album was also included in the book 1001 Albums You Must Hear Before You Die (2005).

In an interview with Popular 1 Magazine, guitarist Kavus Torabi of Cardiacs named The Rise & Fall as one of his favourite albums.

Track listing

2010 reissue

Personnel
Madness
 Graham 'Suggs' McPherson – lead vocals
 Mike Barson – keyboards, harmonica, piano
 Chris Foreman – guitars
 Lee Thompson – saxophones
 Daniel Woodgate – drums
 Mark Bedford – bass guitar, double bass
 Cathal Smyth – backing vocals, trumpet, lead vocals on "Madness (Is All in the Mind)"

Additional Personnel
 Geraldo D'Arbilly – additional percussion 
 David Bedford – brass and string arrangements

Production and artwork
 Clive Langer – producer
 Alan Winstanley – producer
 David Wooley – engineer
 Jeremy Allom – engineer
 Arun Chakraverty – mastering
 Laurie Lewis – front cover photography

2010 reissue
 Madness – producer on "Don't Look Back"
 John Sparrow – producer on the Kid Jensen session
 Mike Robinson – engineer on the Kid Jensen session
 Miti Adhikari – engineer on the Kid Jensen session
 Tim Turan – remastering
 Martin "Cally" Callomon – art direction, design 
 The Stiff Art Department – original graphic design 
 Nik Rose – artwork ("re-jigging and fettling")
 Virginia Turbett – photography 
 Gavin Martin – liner notes

Chart performance

Weekly charts

Year-end charts

Certifications and sales

See also
 List of albums released in 1982
 Madness' discography

References

External links
 

 The Rise & Fall  (Adobe Flash) at Radio3Net (streamed copy where licensed)

1982 albums
Madness (band) albums
Concept albums
Stiff Records albums
Albums produced by Alan Winstanley
Albums produced by Clive Langer